Saskatchewan River fur trade The Saskatchewan River was one of the two main axes of Canadian expansion west of Lake Winnipeg. The other and more important one was northwest to the Athabasca Country. For background see Canadian canoe routes (early). The main trade route followed the North Saskatchewan River and Saskatchewan River, which were just south of the forested beaver country. The South Saskatchewan River was a prairie river with few furs.

Overview 
The Saskatchewan River was a natural highway for furs going east and trade goods going west. The forests to the north provided beaver pelts. The grassland to the south provided buffalo for food and pemmican to feed to voyageurs in the food-poor country to the north. Pemmican was often more important than beaver. Most was sent downriver to Cumberland House, Saskatchewan, before being sent northward, but from 1790 some was sent via a relatively short overland route to the Green Lake, Saskatchewan and on to the Athabasca Country.

The Saskatchewan has no significant portages between the rapids at Rocky Mountain House and its mouth at Lake Winnipeg. Eastbound canoes with that winter's catch had the advantage of the spring meltwater. Westbound trade goods in the summer and fall had to deal with low water and there was significant use of poling and tracking on the upper river. The Hudson's Bay Company built the first proto-York boat on the river at Manchester House in 1788, but the North West Company seems to have preferred north canoes. In the La Montee country west of Prince Albert, "bosses" would borrow horses and go buffalo hunting to feed the regular voyageurs who had to stay in their canoes and continue rowing upstream. When speed was required one could ride horseback parallel to the river. Around 1825 a horse track was cut from Fort Assiniboine, Alberta on the Athabasca River to Edmonton. (The easiest route from the Pacific was through Athabasca Pass to the Athabasca River. The shortcut meant a straighter route and the use of York boats. The Athabasca River route was indirect and required smaller north canoes for the numerous portages.) From the 1870s the slaughter of buffalo, smallpox and the appearance of settlers disrupted Native life. In 1876 an ox-cart road was built from Fort Carlton north to Green Lake. In the mid-1800s, The  Carlton Trail, running along the north bank of the Saskatchewan River, was gradually developed connecting Winnipeg (Red River) to Edmonton.
The first steamboat on the river was the Northcote in 1874.  
In 1905 the Canadian Northern Railway, following the route of the old Carleton Trail, reached Edmonton from Winnipeg.

The boreal forest region to the north was inhabited by Cree who had migrated northwest as middlemen in the fur trade and, in the early and middle 19th century, Saulteaux. Immediately south were the Plains Cree and Assiniboines with the Nakoda (Stoney) near the mountains. To the south were the Gens du large or Plains Indians or First Nations: 
Gros Ventre in Saskatchewan, 
Blackfeet in Alberta and 
Piegan Blackfeet near the Rocky Mountains. Across the mountains were Kootenays.

Since the Cree and Saulteaux had beaver-skins to trade and the plains Natives had little more than buffalo and wolf skins, the northern peoples got most of the guns. They used them to expand south. This made the plains Natives hostile to the traders since they seemed to be allies of the more northern tribes.

Further, many of the voyageurs were part-Cree and knew the language. The trading posts were too well fortified to be easily attacked and were only destroyed when the traders were away. The only exception was Fort Pitt in 1885 which by then no longer had a stockade. In the east the Gros Ventres destroyed South Branch House and Manchester House in 1793–94. In the west the Blackfeet often damaged the fur trade. They did not trade where there were many Cree and tried to keep the Kootenays from getting guns. Fort Sturgeon was burnt in 1780 and Rocky Mountain House in 1860. Fort Pitt and Fort Carlton were burnt during the North-West Rebellion in 1885. (Carlton was accidentally burned down as it was being evacuated in 1885.)

Exploration
1691:Henry Kelsey reached the lower Saskatchewan from Hudson Bay.
1731-1743: Pierre Gaultier de Varennes, sieur de La Vérendrye pushed west from Lake Superior.
1739: Louis-Joseph Gaultier de La Vérendrye was somewhere on the lower Saskatchewan.
1741: Fort Bourbon at the mouth of the Saskatchewan and Fort Paskoya on west side of Cedar Lake.
1753: Fort de la Corne about 20 miles below the Forks.
1755: Anthony Henday, after almost reaching the Rocky Mountains from Hudson Bay, returned down the North Saskatchewan from near Edmonton.
1759: With the conquest trade collapses. It takes the English about 15 years to restore it.
1768: James Findlay at Nipawin.
1774: HBC builds Cumberland House, Saskatchewan downstream from Fort de la Corne. ('first' HBC inland post and gateway to Lake Athabasca.) English "Pedlars" from Montreal below the Forks.
1776: North Saskatchewan reached at Fort Sturgeon.
1781: Cold Lake House (NWC).
1786: Manchester House.
1789: Angus Shaw of the North West Company built a post on the northwest shore of Moose Lake (Alberta) called Fort  or Shaw House.
1792: First post in Alberta on the North Saskatchewan River in Alberta at Buckingham House (fur-trade post).
1795: Fort Edmonton at present-day Fort Saskatchewan
1799: Rocky Mountain House.
1807: David Thompson crossed the Rocky Mountains at Howse Pass.

Map and table

Most of the posts lasted less than ten years because the area became depleted of beaver and because the wooden stockades tended to rot. The major or permanent posts on the North Saskatchewan River were Cumberland House, Fort Pitt, Fort Carlton, Edmonton and Rocky Mountain House. Especially in the east there were a number of minor temporary posts that left few or no records. Until 1811, fur traders affiliated with the NWC and HBC maintained very amicable relations to the extent that the rival posts were often enclosed within the same palisades for mutual protections. After 1811, however, competition between the HBC and the NWC became increasingly intense (Blondal et al. 2008). .

In the table below locations are given by longitude and approximate straight-line distance from the post or landmark to the east. The straight-line distance from Lake Winnipeg to Howse pass is about 1,200 km or 750 miles. For Pedlars see Pedlar (fur trade). For the XY Company see North West Company#Organizational history.

References

Sources
Arthur Morton (1939), A History of the Canadian West.
Elizabeth Browne Losey (1999). Let Them be Remembered:The Story of the Fur Trade Forts. New York: Vantage Press.
Myrna Kostash (2005), Reading the River: A Traveller's Companion to the North Saskatchewan River.
Blöndal, A., J.P. Foster, S. Graham, Y. Kjorlien, A. K. Peach and M. Porter. 2008. Alberta Fur Trade Post Pre-Field Inventory and Assessment, Volume I: Fur Trade Post Inventory. Manuscript on file, Historic Resources Management Branch, Alberta Culture. Edmonton, Alberta.

Economy of Manitoba
Economy of Saskatchewan
Economy of Alberta
North Saskatchewan River
Saskatchewan River
Fur trade
Economic history of Canada